is the 21st single by Japanese singer Yōko Oginome. Written by Keiko Asō and Project.K, the single was released on December 5, 1990 by Victor Entertainment.

Background and release
The song was used as the ending theme of the Fuji TV quiz show Naruhodo! The World.

"Shōnen no Hitomi ni..." peaked at No. 24 on Oricon's singles chart and sold over 28,000 copies.

Track listing
All lyrics are written by Keiko Asō; all music is arranged by Ken Yoshida.

Charts

References

External links

1990 singles
Yōko Oginome songs
Japanese-language songs
Victor Entertainment singles